Yonggang Huang (born 1962) is the Jan and Marcia Achenbach Professor of Mechanical Engineering at Northwestern University.

Huang was elected a member of the National Academy of Engineering in 2017, a member of National Academy of Sciences and a fellow of American Academy of Arts and Sciences in 2020 for pioneering work on mechanics of stretchable electronics and mechanically guided, deterministic 3-D assembly.

Education and career

Yonggang Huang received his BS degree in mechanics from Peking University in 1984.  He moved to the United States to study engineering science in 1986, and earned his ScM and PhD degrees in engineering science from Harvard University in 1987 and 1990, respectively.  He stayed at Harvard as a post-doctoral fellow for one year, and joined the University of Arizona as an assistant professor in 1991.  He moved to Michigan Technological University as an associate professor in 1995, and to University of Illinois at Urbana-Champaign (UIUC) in 1998. He was promoted to full professor in 2001, Grayce Wicall Gauthier Professor in 2003, and Shao Lee Soo Professor in 2004, at UIUC. He joined Northwestern University as the Joseph Cummings Professor in 2007, became the Walter P. Murphy Professor in 2015, and has been the Jan and Marcia Achenbach Professor of Mechanical Engineering since 2020.

Research interests

Huang has been working on mechanics of materials and structures across multiple scales, such as the mechanism-based strain gradient plasticity theory, and atomistic-based continuum theory for carbon nanotubes.  In recent years he has focused on mechanics and thermal analysis of stretchable and dissolvable electronics with applications to energy harvesting and medicine, and mechanically guided, deterministic 3D assembly. His work on the electronic tattoos has been reported by NBC Learn (the education arm of NBC).

Service to the academic societies

He is the Editor-in-Chief of Applied Mechanics Reviews (an ASME Journal), and co-Editor-in-Chief of  Theoretical and Applied Mechanics Letters and of International Journal of Mechanical System Dynamics.

Huang was the Editor-in-Chief of the Journal of Applied Mechanics (Transactions of ASME), and transformed the journal to be the fastest one in mechanics.  For example, among all papers submitted in 2017, the average time from submission to final decision (i.e., reject or accept) is less than 16 days, which include the time for review and the time for the authors’ revision (if needed).

For Society of Engineering Sciences, he was a member of the Board of Directors (2012-2015), Vice President (2013), President (2014), and Past President (2015).

For ASME, he was a member of the Executive Committee (2015-2020), Co-Chair (2016-2017) and Chair (2017-2018) of the mechanics track for IMECE conference, Vice Chair (2018-2019) and Chair (2019-2020) of the Applied Mechanics Division. He was a member of the Drucker Medal Committee (2014-2015), Nadai Medal Committee (2017-2020), and Pi Tau Sigma Awards Committee (2018-2022).  He is a member of the Award Committee of the Applied Mechanics Division (2020-2025), ASME.

For American Society of Civil Engineers, he was a member of the Awards Committee (2016-2018) and Nomination Committee (2016-2018) of the Engineering Mechanics Institute, Bazant Medal Committee (2019-2020), Mindlin Medal Committee (2020-2021), and von Karman Medal Committee (2021-2023).

For the US National Committee of Theoretical and Applied Mechanics, he was a member (2018-2022), Chair of the Solid Mechanics Subcommittee for IUTAM papers (2020), and was on the Nomination Subcommittee (2022).

He is a member (2012-) of the selection committee for Eshelby Mechanics Award for Young Faculty. 

For National Academy of Engineering, he was a member of the Committee of Membership (2022-2023), and a member (2020-2023), Vice Chair (2021-2022) and Chair (2022-2023) of the Peer Committee and a member of the Search Committee (2021-2022) for Mechanical Engineering Section.  He is the secretary, and incoming Vice Chair and Chair of the Mechanical Engineering Section.

For National Academy of Sciences, he is a member of the Temporary Nominating Group for Class III (including applied math, applied physics, computer science, and engineering).  He is on the Editorial Board for the Proceedings of the National Academy of Sciences of the United States of America (PNAS), and is a member of the PNAS Cozzarelli Prize Committee for Class III.

Honors and awards

Yonggang Huang is a member of US National Academy of Engineering, a member of US National Academy of Sciences, a fellow of American Academy of Arts and Sciences, a foreign member of the European Academy of Sciences and Arts, a foreign member of Academia Europaea, and a foreign member of Chinese Academy of Sciences. He has been honored with many recognitions for his research in mechanics and mechanical engineering including the Larson Award (2003), Melville Medal (2004), Richards Award  (2010), Drucker Medal (2013), Nadai Medal (2016), Thurston Lecture Award (2019) and Honorary Member (2021) from the American Society of Mechanical Engineers (ASME); Young Investigator Medal (2006) and Prager Medal (2017) from the Society of Engineering Sciences (SES); International Journal of Plasticity Medal (2007); the Guggenheim Fellowship (2008) from the John Simon Guggenheim Memorial Foundation; Bazant Medal (2018) and von Karman Medal (2019) from the American Society of Civil Engineers (ASCE), and J.N. Reddy Medal (2022) from the journal Mechanics of Advanced Materials and Structures. He is a Highly Cited Researcher in Engineering (2009), in Materials Science and Engineering (2014-), and in Physics (2018). He has been awarded the Honorary Professor from Nanjing University of Posts and Telecommunications, Xi’an Jiaotong University, Southwest Jiaotong University, Huazhong University of Science and Technology, Nanjing University of Science and Technology, Nanjing Tech University, Nanjing University of Aeronautics and Astronautics, Xiangtan University, Beihang University and Shanghai University. His recognitions for undergraduate teaching and advising include the Most Supportive Junior Faculty Member from the Department of Aerospace and Mechanical Engineering, University of Arizona in 1993; On the list of “Teachers Ranked as Excellent by Their Students” in Spring 2003, Spring and Fall 2004, Spring 2005, Fall 2006, and Spring 2007, University of Illinois at Urbana-Champaign; Engineering Council Award for Excellence in Advising from the College of Engineering, University of Illinois at Urbana-Champaign in 2007; Cole-Higgins Award for Excellence in Teaching, McCormick School of Engineering, Northwestern University in 2016; and Associated Student Government Faculty and Administrator Honor Roll, Northwestern University in 2018 and 2020.

Publications

Professor Huang is the author of over 600 publications in international journals, including journals in multiple fields such as mechanics (52 papers in the Journal of the Mechanics and Physics of Solids), electronics (5 in Nature Electronics and 1 in Science Robotics), materials (28 in Advanced Materials, 10 in Nature Materials,  1 each in Nature Reviews Materials and Matter), medicine (1 each in CELL and Neuron, 2 in Nature Biotechnology, 2 in Nature Medicine, 2 in Nature Neuroscience, 6 in Science Translational Medicine and 8 in Nature Biomedical Engineering), nanotechnology (12 in ACS Nano, 8 in Nano Letters and 2 in Nature Nanotechnology), physics (2 in Physical Review Letters), and multidisplinary journals (13 in Science, 19 in Science Advances, 7 in Nature,  19 in Nature Communications, 2 in Nature Protocols and 28 in the Proceedings of the National Academy of Sciences of the United States of America).

References

Living people
Harvard University alumni
1962 births
Northwestern University faculty
Peking University alumni
Engineers from Beijing
Chinese emigrants to the United States
Foreign members of the Chinese Academy of Sciences
Members of the United States National Academy of Engineering